Alitha E. Martinez is an American comic book artist best known for her work on for Marvel Comics's Iron Man, the Heroes webcomics, and DC's Batgirl. Over the course of her career she has worked for all the major comic book publishers, including Marvel, DC Comics, Image Comics, and Archie Comics.

Career 
Martinez attended the School of Visual Arts in the mid-1990s. She has discussed the challenges she faced as often the only female student in her cartooning classes.

For much of the latter half of the 1990s, Martinez worked as a background assistant/inker for other creators, with her earliest known work being her 1993 contribution to the series Cable. Martinez counts 1999 as her big break in comics when she was working as an assistant to Marvel editor Joe Quesada. Via this connection, she became the lead artist on Iron Man, working on the book for the better part of 2000 and 2001.

After a series of short stints and one-shots for the next few years, Martinez became a regular artist on the Season 2 and Season 3 Heroes webcomics produced in 2008–2009 to supplement the popular television show of the same name.

Moving to DC Comics, Martinez co-created the villain Knightfall in Batgirl  #10 (August 2012).

In recent years, she helped create the artwork, including cover art, for a special commemorative issue of Riverdale by Archie Comics. Martinez penciled most of the first five issues of World of Wakanda, a spin-off from the Marvel Comics' Black Panther title that was primarily written by Roxane Gay. In 2017, she was a guest artist for the limited series Lazarus X+66 from Image Comics, written by Greg Rucka. She also worked on five issues of Marvel Comics' Moon Girl and Devil Dinosaur.

In 2019, Martinez released the series Omni with writer Devin K. Grayson for the Humanoids Publishing comic line.

In 2020, art by Martinez was included in the exhibit Women in Comics: Looking Forward, Looking Back at the Society of Illustrators in New York City.

Martinez is on the faculty of the School of Visual Arts.

Personal life 
Martinez is of Honduran and Curaçao heritage. She has a son named Michael.

Awards 
 2018 Eisner Award for Best Limited Series (World of Wakanda)
 2018 GLAAD Media Award for Outstanding Comic Book

Bibliography (selected)

Archie Comics 
 New Crusaders issues #3–5 (2013) – with writer Ian Flynn
 Riverdale One-Shot (2017) – with writer Will Ewing
 Mighty Crusaders #1 (Dec. 2018) – with writer Ian Flynn

DC Comics 
 Batgirl issues #7, 8, 10 (2012) – with writer Gail Simone
 Vertigo Quarterly CMYK #1 (2014) – with writer Amy Chu
 Represent: It's a Bird! (2020) — with writer Christian Cooper

Devil's Due Publishing 
 Voltron: Defender of the Universe #9–11 (2004) – with writer Dan Jolley

Graphic Universe 
 The Quest for Dragon Mountain: Book 16 (Twisted Journeys) (2010) – with writer Robin Mayhall

Heroes 
 Faces, Part 1 (2008) – with writer Mark Sable
 Berlin parts 1 and 2 (2008) – with writer Christopher Zatta
 Hindsight (2008) – with writer Oliver Grigsby
 Foresight (2008) – with writer Zach Craley
 Dreams Unto Death (2008) – with writer Christopher Zatta
 The Sting of Injustice (2008) – with writer Christopher Zatta
 Viewpoints (2008) – with writer Chuck Kim
 The Caged Bird parts 1 and 2 (2008) – with writer Timm Keppler
 What We Have Wrought (2009) – with writer Joseph Robert Donnelly

Humanoids/H1 
 Omni issues #1–2 (2019) – with writer Devin K. Grayson

Image Comics 
 Lazarus: X+66 #4 (2017) – with writers Greg Rucka and Eric Trautmann

Marvel Comics 
 Cable 1999 (1999) – with writers Michael Higgins and Karl Bollers
 Iron Man issues #28–40 (2000–2001) – with writers Joe Quesada and Frank Tieri
 Marvel Age: Fantastic Four issues #3, 9, 10 (2005) – with writers Sean McKeever and Marc Sumerak
 Black Panther: World of Wakanda issues #1–5 (2017) – with writer Roxane Gay
 X-Men Gold Annual #1 (Mar. 2018) – with writers Marc Guggenheim and Leah Williams
 Moon Girl and Devil Dinosaur #26, #44–47 (2018–2019) – with writer Brandon Montclare

NBM/Papercutz 
 WWE Slam City Comics (2014) – with writer Mathias Triton
 Papercutz Free Comic Book Day #11 (2016) – with writer Sarah Kuhn

References

External links
 
 
 

African-American comics creators
American cartoonists
American comics creators
American comics writers
American female comics artists
American women cartoonists
Living people
School of Visual Arts alumni
Year of birth missing (living people)
21st-century African-American people
21st-century African-American women